The Canadian Short Screenplay Competition (CSSC) is an annual script writing contest, established in 2008, that seeks to celebrate excellence in short film screenwriting.

History
The CSSC, founded in 2008 by producer David Cormican, is administered by Year of the Skunk Productions. The competition's partners in 2008 included Playback, Meridian Artists, InkTip.com, The Spoke Club and Withoutabox.

In August 2009, the competition started the now popular #WW (Writer(s) Wednesday) hashtag on social networking site Twitter.com.

In 2010, the competition partnered with the Yorkton Film Festival, allowing the CSSC to announce the winner of the competition as part of the Golden Sheaf Awards gala. The first winner announced in this fashion on May 29, 2010 in Yorkton, SK, was British writer Neil Graham. Mr. Graham (and his winning script "Something Pointless"), was the very first recipient of the Writers Block Crystal, introduced to the competition in 2010 as a take-away award for the winning screenwriter.

In June 2010, the CSSC announced two-time competition finalist Carolynne Ciceri, as the inaugural #WW Writers Wednesday Laureate. Ms. Ciceri's duties as #WW Laureate consist of a year-long position posting a weekly blog communication on the subjects of writing, filmmaking and short films.

On January 1, 2011, the CSSC's THE Blog was announced as a winner of the 2010 Canadian Weblog Awards in the category of 'Writing and Literature'.

#WW Writers Wednesday

The CSSC maintains that they conceptualized and posted the very first weekly hashtag #WW (popularly used and known amongst writing circles as Writer(s) Wednesday) on popular social media networking site Twitter.com. Writers and users of the site may nominate writers on Twitter that others using the social networking site should follow by using the #WW hashtag (similar to #ff or #followfriday) within a tweet on the site.

The original #WW Writers Wednesday tweet was made using TweetDeck on August 5, 2009.

2010/11 Winners

1- "Elijah the Prophet", Jesse & Zachary Herrmann 
2- "Strange Music", Ira Henderson 
3- "13", Sundae Jahant-Osborn

2009/10 Winners

1- "Something Pointless", Neil Graham 
2- "Minus Lara", Surita Parmar 
3- "The Kicker", Jag Dhadli

The Canadian Short Screenplay Competition filmed "Minus Lara" starring Romina D'Ugo in Regina, Saskatchewan and "Rusted Pyre" starring Samantha Somer Wilson and Brooke Palsson in Havelock, Saskatchewan in the month of November, 2010.

2008 Winners

2008 Best in Fest Recipient: Seeing In The Dark written by Gordon Pengilly 
2008 Golden Cinema Recipient: No Man’s Land written by David Carey 
2008 Silver Screen Recipient: Rusted Pyre written by Daniel Audet

References

External links

Official Competition Website

Film festivals in Saskatchewan
Short film festivals in Canada
Writing contests
Film competitions
Competitions in Canada
Yorkton Film Festival
Short film awards